Luis Pedro Suela Méndez (born July 7, 1976 in Madrid) is a Spanish volleyball player who represented his native country at the 2000 Summer Olympics in Sydney, Australia. There he finished ninth place with the Men's National Team. He is currently plays for CAI Voleibol Teruel in Spain.

References
  Spanish Olympic Committee

1976 births
Living people
Sportspeople from Madrid
Spanish men's volleyball players
Volleyball players at the 2000 Summer Olympics
Olympic volleyball players of Spain
Arkas Spor volleyball players
Mediterranean Games silver medalists for Spain
Competitors at the 2005 Mediterranean Games
Mediterranean Games medalists in volleyball